Yoo Byung-hoon (born June 30, 1972) is a Paralympian athlete from South Korea competing mainly in category T53 middle-distance events.

Yoo competed at the 2008 Summer Paralympics in Beijing. He competed in the T53 400m, T53 800m and the T54 1500m without medaling, he also competed in the South Korean teams in the 4 × 400 m and the bronze medal-winning 4 × 100 m team.

External links
 profile on paralympic.org

Paralympic athletes of South Korea
Athletes (track and field) at the 2008 Summer Paralympics
Athletes (track and field) at the 2020 Summer Paralympics
Paralympic bronze medalists for South Korea
Living people
1972 births
Medalists at the 2008 Summer Paralympics
Paralympic medalists in athletics (track and field)
South Korean wheelchair racers
Medalists at the 2010 Asian Para Games
Medalists at the 2014 Asian Para Games
Medalists at the 2018 Asian Para Games